Crimson Skies is a 2006 studio album by the Swedish metal band Cloudscape. It is the band's second studio album. On June 9, 2006 Cloudscape performed at the Sweden Rock Festival to promote Crimson Skies followed by other appearances at clubs and festivals around in Europe. A performance of the song "Demon Tears" was filmed and released as music video to promote the album. On the song "Will We Remain", singer Anette Olzon (credited as Anette Blyckert) appeared as guest on vocals.

Personnel
Mike Andersson - Lead & Backing Vocals
Björn Eliasson - Guitars (Daniel Pålsson on album)
Patrik Svärd - Guitars
Haynes Pherson - Bass & Backing Vocals
Roger Landin - Drums & Percussion
Anette Olzon (credited as Anette Blyckert) guest vocals on "Will We Remain"

References

External links 
 

2006 albums
Cloudscape albums